Paul Beatty (born June 9, 1962) is an American author and an associate professor of writing at Columbia University. In 2016, he won the National Book Critics Circle Award and the Booker Prize for his novel The Sellout. It was the first time a writer from the United States was honored with the Man Booker.

Early life and education 
He was born in Los Angeles, California, in 1962. Beatty received an MFA degree in creative writing from Brooklyn College and an MA degree in psychology from Boston University. He is a 1980 graduate of El Camino Real High School in Woodland Hills, California.
Beatty is married to filmmaker Althea Wasow, sister of BlackPlanet co-founder Omar Wasow.

Career 
In 1990, Beatty was crowned the first ever Grand Poetry Slam Champion of the Nuyorican Poets Cafe. One of the prizes for winning the championship title was the book deal that resulted in his first volume of poetry, Big Bank Take Little Bank (1991). This was followed by another book of poetry, Joker, Joker, Deuce (1994), and appearances performing his poetry on MTV and PBS (in the series The United States of Poetry). In 1993, he was awarded a grant from the Foundation for Contemporary Arts Grants to Artists Award.

His first novel, The White Boy Shuffle (1996), received a positive review in The New York Times from reviewer Richard Bernstein, who called the book "a blast of satirical heat from the talented heart of Black American life." His second novel, Tuff (2000), received a positive notice in Time magazine, where it was described as being "like an extended rap song, its characters recounting struggle and survival with the bravado of hip-hoppers." In 2006, Beatty edited an anthology of African-American humor called Hokum and wrote an article in The New York Times on the same subject. His 2008 novel Slumberland was about an American DJ in Berlin, and reviewer Patrick Neate said: "At its best, Beatty's writing is shockingly original, scabrous and very funny."

In his 2015 novel The Sellout, Beatty chronicles an urban farmer who tries to spearhead a revitalization of slavery and segregation in a fictional Los Angeles neighborhood. In The Guardian, Elisabeth Donnelly described it as "a masterful work that establishes Beatty as the funniest writer in America", while reviewer Reni Eddo-Lodge called it a "whirlwind of a satire", going on to say: "Everything about The Sellouts plot is contradictory. The devices are real enough to be believable, yet surreal enough to raise your eyebrows." The book took more than five years to complete.

The Sellout was awarded the 2015 National Book Critics Circle Award for fiction, and the 2016 Man Booker Prize. Beatty is the first American to have won the Man Booker Prize, for which all English-language novels became eligible in 2014.

Awards and honors
2009 Creative Capital Award for Slumberland
2015 National Book Critics Circle Award (Fiction), winner for The Sellout.
2016 Booker Prize winner for The Sellout.
2017 International Dublin Literary Award long-list for The Sellout

Works

Poetry
 Big Bank Take Little Bank (1991). Nuyorican Poets Cafe Press. 
 Joker, Joker, Deuce (1994).

Fiction
 The White Boy Shuffle (1996). 
 Tuff (2000). Alfred A. Knopf. 
 Slumberland (2008). Bloomsbury USA, 
 The Sellout (2015). New York: Farrar Straus Giroux. London: Oneworld Publications, 2016.  (hardback), 978-1786070159 (paperback)

Edited volume
 Hokum: An Anthology of African-American Humor (2006). Bloomsbury USA.

References

External links
 Beatty, Paul, "Black Humor", The New York Times, January 22, 2006.
 African American Literature Book Club for Paul Beatty
 Excerpt from Slumberland at BookBrowse
 Interview at Full Stop, June 30, 2015.
 Gatti, Tom, "Paul Beatty: 'I invented a Richter scale for racism'", New Statesman, November 2, 2016.
 Oscar Villalon, "Paul Beatty on Los Angeles Lit, The Sellout, and Life After the Man Booker", Zyzzyva, June 4, 2018, via LitHub.

1962 births
Living people
20th-century American novelists
20th-century American male writers
Writers from Los Angeles
African-American novelists
Booker Prize winners
Brooklyn College alumni
Boston University alumni
Columbia University faculty
Columbia University people
21st-century American novelists
American humorists
20th-century American poets
21st-century American poets
American male novelists
American male poets
Anthologists
21st-century American male writers
El Camino Real High School alumni
Novelists from New York (state)
African-American poets
20th-century African-American writers
21st-century African-American writers
African-American male writers